The Income Tax Act 1967, is a Malaysian law establishing the imposition of income tax.

Structure
The Income Tax Act 1967, in its current form (1 January 2006), consists of 10 Parts containing 156 sections and 9 schedules (including 77 amendments).
 Part I: Preliminary
 Part II: Imposition and General Characteristics of the Tax
 Part III: Ascertainment of Chargeable Income
 Chapter 1: Preliminary
 Chapter 2: Basis years and basis periods
 Chapter 3: Gross income
 Chapter 4: Adjusted income and adjusted loss
 Chapter 5: Statutory income
 Chapter 6: Aggregate income and total income
 Chapter 7: Chargeable income
 Chapter 8: Special cases
 Part IV: Persons Chargeable
 Part V: Returns
 Part VI: Assessments and Appeals
 Chapter 1: Assessments
 Chapter 2: Appeals
 Part VII: Collection and Recovery of Tax
 Part VIIA: Fund for Tax Refund
 Part VIII: Offences and Penalties
 Part IX: Exemptions, Remission and Other Relief
 Part IXA: Special Incentive Relief
 Part X: Supplemental
 Chapter 1: Administration
 Chapter 2: Controlled companies and powers to protect the revenue in case of certain transactions
 Chapter 3: Miscellaneous
 Schedules

References

 Income Tax Act 1967 

1967 in Malaysian law
Malaysian federal legislation